Glenbervie was launched at Glasgow in 1815. Initially she was a constant trader between Greenock and Demerara. In 1839 the New Zealand Shipping Company chartered her to carry supplies to support immigration to New Zealand. In the 1840s and 1850s she traded more widely, sailing to Australia, the Caribbean, and South America. A fire destroyed her in August 1860.

Career
Glenbervie first appeared in Lloyd's Register (LR) in 1815. For the next 20 or so years she sailed between Greenock and Demerara.

The privateer hailed Glenbervie, demanding to know where she was coming from and where she was bound. The privateer then permitted her to proceed but remained in sight until the 22nd. Glenbervie arrived at Greenock on 15 November. 

Glenbervie sailed for New Zealand in 1839 under Captain William Black. She was among a group of ships that the New Zealand Shipping Company had chartered to carry settlers. Glenbervie sailed from London on 2 October 1839. The vessels were to rendezvous at Port Hardy on Durville Island on 10 January 1840; at the rendezvous they were told their final destination. Glenburnie arrived at Port Nicholson on 7 March 1840 in the company of Tory and Adelaide. Glenbervie was carrying the Manager, clerks, and a well-lined safe which was used to set up a branch of the Union Bank of Australia, New Zealand's first bank. In total she carried seven settlers.

Glenbervie sailed to the Pacific, Caribbean, and South America during the 1840s and 1850s. 

She was wrecked on 23 December 1848, salvaged, and repaired the following January at Bristol. The Illustrated London News reported: 

The last sailing reported in Australian Newspapers was in 1859 when she sailed for Guam from Adelaide on 1 March under Captain James Anderson. 

Note: The Times mistakenly reported that Glenbervie had been run down and sunk in July 1843. In a later story it reported that the vessel that had been lost was

Fate
A fire off the Falkland Islands on 6 August 1860 destroyed Glenbervie; the British merchant ship Tigre rescued her crew. The crew were landed at Monte Video, Uruguay. Glenbervie was on a voyage from Glasgow to Valparaíso.

Citations

1815 ships
Age of Sail merchant ships of England
Maritime incidents in August 1860
Maritime incidents in December 1848
Ships built in Glasgow